Alessandro Sforza (1534–1581) was an Italian Roman Catholic bishop and cardinal.

Biography

A member of the House of Sforza, Alessandro Sforza was born in Rome in 1534, the son of Bosio II Sforza, count of Santa Fiora e Cotignola, and his wife Costanza Farnese, who was the natural and legitimized daughter of Pope Paul III. His brother Guido Ascanio Sforza di Santa Fiora also became a cardinal.  He was the uncle of Cardinal Francesco Sforza.

He gained the academic title of Magister.  Early in his ecclesiastical career, he became a papal chaplain.  He became a scriptor of apostolic letters.  On 12 January 1554 he became a cleric of the Apostolic Camera.  He became a canon of St. Peter's Basilica on 18 April 1554.  He was involved in a minor scandal after he made French vessels travel from Civitavecchia to Gaeta that caused Pope Paul IV deprive him of his charges and benefits.  After the vessels were returned and some cardinals intervened, the pope restored him to his former offices on 8 October 1557.  

On 26 April 1560 he was elected Bishop of Parma  and was named praefectus annonae on 1 July 1560.  In 1562-63, he was a participant in the Council of Trent.  

Pope Pius IV made him a cardinal priest in the consistory of 12 March 1565.  He received the red hat and the titular church of Santa Maria in Via Lata on 15 May 1565.  He participated in the papal conclave of 1565-66 that elected Pope Pius V.  Together with Cardinals Giovanni Ricci, Giovanni Francesco Commendone, and Marcantonio Bobba, was named by Pope Pius V inspector of rivers, ports and public roads of Rome.  On 5 January 1570 the pope named him papal legate a latere to Bologna and Romagna.  

Alessandro Sforza participated in the papal conclave of 1572 that elected Pope Gregory XIII.  The new pope named him archpriest of the Basilica di Santa Maria Maggiore; during the jubilee year of 1575, he opened the holy door there.  Gregory XIII also made him cardinal protector of Spain.  Sometime before 30 March 1573 he resigned the government of the Diocese of Parma.  He was named Prefect of the Apostolic Signatura on 12 January 1575.  On 11 July 1580 he was named papal legate to the Papal States (in addition to remaining legate to Bologna), charged with eliminating banditry.

He died suddenly in Macerata on 16 May 1581.  He was buried in the Sforza family chapel in the Basilica di Santa Maria Maggiore.

References

1534 births
1581 deaths
16th-century Italian cardinals
Alessandro
Clergy from Rome